William Ernest Johnstone Holdship (15 February 1872 – 14 March 1936) was an English first-class cricketer active 1894 who played for Middlesex. He was born in Auckland, and died in Sydney on 14 March 1936.

References

1872 births
1936 deaths
English cricketers
Middlesex cricketers
People from Auckland